Kuruvattoor   is a village in Palakkad district in the state of Kerala, India.  The village shares its borders with Kailiyad, Mundakottukurussi, Vallappuzha and Kanayam. The village comes under Vallapuzha Panchayat, Pattambi block and Pattambi Taluk. The village is encouraging arts and sports, especially football.  Many clubs and local bodies create events for boosting cultural aspects.

Geography

Kuruvattur is geographically divided into 4 regions, [i] Kuruvattur North (Vadakkumuri), [ii] Kuruvattur East (Kizhakkekara), [iii] Kuruvattur West (Chungappilavu), and [iv] Kuruvattur South (Kanayam).
And this small village shares borders with Shoranur Municipality in South and Chalavara Grama Panchayat in East.
There are two Aided Lower Primary schools and One Upper Primary school in this village and a CBSE school also. The homeopathy health centre of Vallapuzha Panchayat is placed at Kuruvattur.

Politics

Kuruvattoor is part of Palakkad Lok Sabha constituency and Pattambi Legislative Assembly Constituency. It was a part of Valluvanad Taluk in Malabar District of Madras Presidency of British India.

Air

Calicut International Airport, Cochin International Airport and Coimbatore Airport are the nearest airports.

Train

Vallapuzha Railway station and Shoranur Junction railway station are the nearest railway stations.

Climate

References

Villages in Palakkad district